Dhanare Paskal Janya (1971/1972 – 12 April 2021) was an Indian politician and member of the Bharatiya Janata Party. He was a first term member of the Maharashtra Legislative Assembly.

Janya died in 2021 from COVID-19 on 12 April, aged 49.

Constituency
Dhanare Paskal Janya was elected from the Dahanu constituency Maharashtra.

Positions held 
Maharashtra Legislative Assembly MLA.
Terms in office: 2014–2019.

References 

1970s births
2021 deaths
Marathi politicians
Bharatiya Janata Party politicians from Maharashtra
Maharashtra MLAs 2014–2019
Place of birth missing
Place of death missing
Deaths from the COVID-19 pandemic in India
Year of birth missing
People from Palghar district